Mørkfoss is a small village in Trøgstad municipality, Viken, Norway. It is located in the southern end of lake Øyeren, at the continuation of Glomma river. Mørkfoss has traces of a dam construction which was built in connection to the Solbergfoss power plant.

References
Mørkfoss Trøgstad/Spydeberg 

Villages in Østfold
Populated places on the Glomma River